Herbulot is a French-language surname. Notable people with this surname include:

Claude Herbulot (1908–2006), French entomologist
Guy Herbulot (1925–2021), French Roman Catholic prelate
Jean-Jacques Herbulot (1909–1997), French sailor
Jean Luc Herbulot (born 1983), Congolese film director and screenwriter

References

See also

French-language surnames